The individual show jumping or "Prix des Nations" at the 1952 Summer Olympics took place on 3 August, at the Helsinki Olympic Stadium. It was the ninth appearance of the event. For the first time, the event featured two rounds. There were 51 competitors from 20 nations, with each nation able to send a team of up to three riders with the results shared between team and individual events. The event was won by Pierre Jonquères d'Oriola of France, the nation's first victory in individual jumping since 1912 and second overall (the first nation to win a second gold medal in the event; the previous eight editions were all won by riders of different nationalities). Óscar Cristi of Chile took silver for that nation's first medal in the event. German rider Fritz Thiedemann earned bronze.

Background

This was the ninth appearance of the event, which had first been held at the 1900 Summer Olympics and has been held at every Summer Olympics at which equestrian sports have been featured (that is, excluding 1896, 1904, and 1908). It is the oldest event on the current programme, the only one that was held in 1900.

Three of the top 12 riders from the 1948 competition returned: gold medalist Humberto Mariles of Mexico, fifth-place finisher Jaime García of Spain, and seventh-place finisher Harry Llewellyn of Great Britain.

Egypt, South Korea, and the Soviet Union each made their debut in the event. France and Sweden both competed for the eighth time, tied for the most of any nation; Sweden had missed only the inaugural 1900 competition, while France missed the individual jumping in 1932.

Competition format

The team and individual jumping competitions used the same results. The course was 786 metres long with 13 obstacles, including a triple jump obstacle (fence, water jump, horizontal wall). The time limit was 1 minute, 57.2 seconds (400 m/min). Penalty points were received for obstacle faults (3, 4, 6, or 8 points based on severity) or exceeding the time limit (0.25 points per second or fraction thereof over the limit). A third refusal or jumping an obstacle out of order resulted in elimination. Scores from the two runs were added together for a total score.

Schedule

All times are Eastern European Summer Time (UTC+3)

Results

A five-way tie for first resulted in a need for a barrage.

 Jump-off

The five-way tie for first was resolved through a jump-off barrage. The course for the jump-off featured 6 obstacles. The same faults scoring was used. No time penalties were awarded, but the fastest time broke ties (based on faults) within the jump-off.

References

Sources
Organising Committee for the XV Olympiad, The (1952). The Official Report of the Organising Committee for the XV Olympiad, pp. 517, 531–33. LA84 Foundation. Retrieved 22 October 2019.

Equestrian at the 1952 Summer Olympics